Quyujiq (also known as Qūyjūq and Qūyūjūq) is a village in Nazarkahrizi Rural District, Nazarkahrizi District, Hashtrud County, East Azerbaijan Province, Iran. At the 2006 census, its population was 23, in 4 families.

References 

Towns and villages in Hashtrud County